Valentín González Bautista (born 3 November 1955) is a Mexican politician affiliated with the PRD. He currently serves as Deputy of the LXII Legislature of the Mexican Congress representing the State of Mexico. He also served as a federal deputy during the LIX Legislature and a local deputy in the LIV Legislature of the Congress of the State of Mexico. He was also municipal president of Ciudad Nezahualcóyotl from 1997 to 2000.

References

1955 births
Living people
Politicians from Oaxaca
Party of the Democratic Revolution politicians
20th-century Mexican politicians
21st-century Mexican politicians
National Autonomous University of Mexico alumni
Members of the Congress of the State of Mexico
Municipal presidents in the State of Mexico
Deputies of the LXII Legislature of Mexico
Members of the Chamber of Deputies (Mexico) for the State of Mexico